Israel Bissell (1752 – October 24, 1823) was a patriot post rider in Massachusetts who brought news to American colonists of the British attack on Lexington and Concord on April 19, 1775.  He reportedly rode for four days and six hours, covering the 345 miles from Watertown, Massachusetts to Philadelphia along the Old Post Road, shouting "To arms, to arms, the war has begun", and carrying a message from General Joseph Palmer, which was copied at each of his stops and redistributed.

Life
Israel Bissell Jr. was born to Israel Bissell Sr. (1718–1776) and Hannah Sackett (1726–1799) in the year 1752. His precise date of birth is unknown. His birthplace was East Windsor Hill, Connecticut Colony, now part of the town of South Windsor, Connecticut. Not much is known in his life up to the 1775 midnight ride from Lexington to Philadelphia.

Letter

According to legend, at the end of Bissell's first leg, Watertown to Worcester, his first horse collapsed and died from having been driven so hard.

After completing his ride, Bissell returned to Connecticut, where he joined the army alongside his brother, Justis. After the war, he moved to Middlefield, Massachusetts, where he married Lucy Hancock and became a sheep farmer. In the 1790 and 1800 United States Census he is listed in Middlefield, and in the 1820 Census he is listed in [Hinsdale, Massachusetts]. Bissell died on October 24, 1823 and was buried in the Maple Street Cemetery in Hinsdale, Massachusetts.

Timeline of 1775 ride
 April 19, 10 a.m., Watertown, Massachusetts
 April 19, noon, Worcester, Massachusetts
 April 19, 9 p.m. Pomfret, Connecticut
 April 20, 11 a.m., Brooklyn, Connecticut
 April 20, 4 p.m., Norwich, Connecticut
 April 20, 7 p.m., New London, Connecticut
 April 21, 1 a.m., Lyme, Connecticut
 April 21, 4 a.m., Old Saybrook, Connecticut
 April 21, 10 a.m., Guilford, Connecticut
 April 21, noon, Branford, Connecticut
 Fairfield, Connecticut
 April 23, 4 p.m., Wall Street, New York City
 Elizabeth, New Jersey
 New Brunswick, New Jersey
 Trenton, New Jersey
 April 24, 5 p.m., Philadelphia

This timetable appears in Elias Boudinot's book Journal of Events in the Revolution.

In popular culture
Although Paul Revere is better known due to the epic poem by Henry Wadsworth Longfellow, Bissell was the subject of the less well known "Ride, Israel, Ride", an epic poem by Marie Rockwood of Stockbridge, Massachusetts. According to Syracuse University professor of television and popular culture, Robert Thompson, this is not representative of the relative importance or heroism of each feat; rather, "Paul Revere rhymes with a lot more than Israel Bissell". Bissell's place in history was even further smudged by several historical documents which refer to him as "Trail Bissel", or even, as in the document reproduced here, "Tryal Russell". The error occurred when his name was transcribed hastily from the handwritten copy by the printer rushing to get the news set in type. There were also an unknown number of other riders whose names are now completely forgotten. Since many institutions across the country have brought their historical collections online, providing researchers from afar the ability to view original source documents, current scholarship now makes the case for Israel Bissell.

Bissell's exploits have been noted in magazines, newspaper accounts, and an anthology of Revolutionary era documents published during the U.S. Bicentennial celebration in 1976. Bissell was first honored in the Berkshires by Hinsdale historian Marion Ransford, who drew upon historic documents in the archives of Western Reserve Historical Society in Cleveland. At the behest of Mrs. Ransford, the Daughters of the American Revolution installed a special marker at Bissell's grave. Realtor Isadore Goodman donated the Bissell homestead site on Plunkett Lake Road to the town in 1972.

Bissell was mentioned in comedian Robert Wuhl's 2006 HBO special, Assume the Position with Mr. Wuhl. Wuhl timed Bissell as having left at the same time as Revere (which clearly conflicts with Boudinot's timeline), and joked that his name sounded like a Jewish vacuum cleaner to demonstrate why Longfellow decided to use Paul Revere as the poem's hero instead.

Bissell was portrayed by David Bluvband on the cult public access program, The Chris Gethard Show in the episode "18th Century American Gladiators", which aired in August 2014.

Bissel was mentioned in ABC’s show, American Housewife, Season 5 Episode 2. Greg Otto, the president of Westport, Connecticut’s Historical Society, sees a sign for a future development project on the same field where it is said that Bissel stopped to feed his horse on the way to Philadelphia.  Otto then begins to lobby the city council to stop the development of the land.

Controversy
Historian Lion G. Miles extracted several documents from the Massachusetts Archives that seem to erroneously question whether an "Israel Bissell" actually rode all the way to Philadelphia. The documents reportedly support that an "Isaac Bissell" did, indeed, ride with news of the attack on Lexington, but only as far as Hartford, Connecticut. Bissell billed for six days of expenses while in Connecticut, rather than a full trip to Philadelphia.

See also
Paul Revere
Samuel Prescott
Sybil Ludington

References

 The Boston Globe, April 20, 1997
 The Boston Globe, April 19, 1982
 "Bissell Outrode Paul Revere But History Left Him in the Dust", Hartford Courant, April 16, 2007

External links

DW Roth: Bissell
Lemen: Bissell painting
Broadside
"Israel Bissell's Ride" and "I. Bissell's Ride" (two poems)

1752 births
1823 deaths
People from East Windsor, Connecticut
People of Massachusetts in the American Revolution
Patriots in the American Revolution
People of colonial Massachusetts
People of Connecticut in the American Revolution
Burials in Massachusetts
People from Middlefield, Massachusetts